Paulet, variant spelling Powlett, is a surname. Notable people with the surname include:

Amias Paulet (1532–1588), English diplomat
Anthony Paulet (1562–1600), Governor of the Isle of Jersey (1588–1600)
Charles Paulet, 1st Duke of Bolton (c. 1625 – 1699)
Charles Paulet, 2nd Duke of Bolton (1661–1722)
Charles Powlett, 3rd Duke of Bolton (1685–1754)
Charles Powlett, 5th Duke of Bolton (1718–1765)
Charles Powlett (1728–1809), English clergyman and cricket administrator
Charles Paulet, 13th Marquess of Winchester (1764–1843)
Charles Armand Powlett (c. 1694 – 1751), British soldier
Christopher Paulet, Earl of Wiltshire (born 1969)
Frederick Powlett (1811–1865), Australian politician and cricket administrator
George Paulet (1553–1608) (died 1608), English soldier
George Paulet, 12th Marquess of Winchester (1722–1800), English courtier 
Lord George Paulet (1803–1879), officer in the Royal Navy
Harry Powlett, 4th Duke of Cleveland (1803–1891)
Harry Powlett, 4th Duke of Bolton (1691–1759)
Harry Powlett, 6th Duke of Bolton (1720–1794)
Henry Paulet (1767–1832), Royal Navy vice-admiral
Henry Powlett, 3rd Baron Bayning (1797–1866)
John Paulet, 2nd Marquess of Winchester (c. 1510 – 1576)
John Paulet, 5th Marquess of Winchester (c. 1598 – 1675)
Jean-Jacques Paulet (1740–1826), French mycologist
Iozefina Păuleţ (born 1989), Romanian and Dutch women chess grandmaster
Lord Nassau Powlett (1698–1741), English nobleman and politician
Nigel Paulet, 18th Marquess of Winchester (born 1941)
Pedro Paulet (1874–1945), Peruvian scientist
Thomas Orde-Powlett, 1st Baron Bolton (1740–1807)
William Paulet, 1st Marquess of Winchester (c. 1483 – 1572), English statesman
William Paulet, 3rd Marquess of Winchester (1532–1598)
William Paulet, 4th Marquess of Winchester (c. 1560 – 1628)
William Paulet, Lord St John (c. 1587 – 1621)
William Orde-Powlett, 5th Baron Bolton (1869–1944)
Lord William Paulet (1804–1893), British Army officer
Lord William Powlett (c. 1667 – 1729), English MP for Winchester 1689–1710

See also
Pawlett, Somerset, a village in the West of England
Paulet Island, island located off Graham Land Peninsula in Antarctica
Paulet Affair, 1843 incident in which the namesake British naval officer occupied Hawaii for five months
Powlett River, in Victoria, Australia